Maria Abrahamsson (born 21 July 1963 in Kalmar) is a Swedish lawyer, journalist and politician for the Moderate Party. She was member of the Riksdag from 2010 to 2018. Previously she worked for ten years as an editorial journalist for 
Svenska Dagbladet.

References

1963 births
Living people
Swedish jurists
Members of the Riksdag from the Moderate Party
Swedish women journalists
20th-century Swedish journalists